José Acasuso and Sebastián Prieto were the defending champions, but lost in the first round to Lucas Arnold Ker and Juan Mónaco.

Pablo Cuevas and Brian Dabul won in the final, 6–3, 6–3, over František Čermák and Michal Mertiňák.

Seeds

Draw

Draw

External links
Draw

Doubles